Robert A. Holton (born 1944) is an American academic chemist who is known for his work regarding the chemical synthesis for Taxol (known as the Holton Taxol total synthesis), a widely utilized and highly effective anti-cancer drug.  He is a Professor of Chemistry at Florida State University.

Dr. Holton’s research group has accomplished the total synthesis of several natural products. Most notable are prostaglandin F2α, narwedine, aphidicolin, taxusin, Taxol and hemibrevetoxin B.

Dr. Holton also serves as Chief Scientific Officer, a member of the Board of Directors and co-founder of Taxolog, Inc., as well as President and founder of MDS Research Foundation and Syncure, Inc.

Education
 Bachelors from the University of North Carolina
 Doctorate from Florida State University

See also
Paclitaxel total synthesis

References

External links
 Florida State University faculty profile
 Taxolog profile

Florida State University faculty
Florida State University alumni
Living people
1944 births